Al-Quds Mosque (Berber: ⵎⴻⵣⴳⵉⴷⴰ ⵍⵇⵓⴷⵙ) formerly , is a mosque in the Roches Noires neighborhood of Casablanca, Morocco. It was originally built as a church built in a Neo-Gothic style, but it was converted into a mosque after Morocco's independence.

History 
The Church of Saint Margaret was built by a Frenchman named Eugène Lendrat—the founder of the Roches Noires neighborhood—in 1920, copying a church called , built in 1860 by Émile Boeswillwald in Pau, Pyrénées-Atlantiques.

The Church of Saint Margaret was transformed into a mosque in 1981, at the time of the Moroccanization policies of Hassan II, which led to a mass exodus of Europeans from Morocco.

References

Mosques in Morocco
Buildings and structures in Casablanca
Mosques converted from churches